"My Princess" is the season seven finale and the 150th episode of the American sitcom Scrubs. It was broadcast on May 8, 2008 on NBC. Although produced as episode 9, the episode was rearranged to be the season finale due to the season being cut short because of the 2007–2008 Writers Guild of America strike.

Plot 
Dr. Kelso, to try to prevent the staff from making mistakes due to tiredness that will make the hospital liable and open for lawsuits, says that anyone caught working past their shifts will be suspended. Dr. Cox recounts this tough day at the hospital to his son through an imaginative fairy tale. When Princess Elliot's handmaiden, i.e. one of Elliot Reid's patients, falls ill at the hands of an unknown monster, the Princess summons the Village Idiot, J.D., to help rescue her. But with the Dark Lord Oslek (Dr. Kelso) standing in their way, the duo can't do it alone. The Prince (Keith) is still in love with the Princess and tries to win her back, to no avail.

The Giant (Janitor) keeps an eye out for the heroes while the two-headed Turla, a combination of Turk and Carla, lends some magic, but it's the brave knight in shining armor (the storyteller, Dr. Cox) that lends them the knowledge that may save the day. However, with Dr. Kelso's new rules, the staff of Sacred Heart may not have time to figure out how to slay the monster. The Idiot and the Princess admit they both tried to kiss each other as they were "both running away from something".

In the end, J.D. concludes the woman has Wilson's disease and needs a new liver. Dr. Cox tells his son that the maiden lived, but when he exits the room Jordan asks him whether or not she really survived. He suggests that she didn't, saying, "that's the way I'm telling it."

Continuity
After saying in an earlier episode that he has stress-induced dyslexia, Ted refers to Dr. Kelso as Dr. Oslek, the name Dr. Cox gives the Dark Lord.
When Boon and Debbie are playing "Diagnosis Jeopardy", you can hear Boon call her "Slaggy", referencing the episode, "His Story IV", when Dr. Kelso decides to call her "Slagathor".
In an earlier episode Dr. Kelso retires from his position of Chief of Medicine, but in "My Princess" he still holds the position.

Production details
"My Princess" concluded the seventh season of Scrubs on NBC. Directed by series star Zach Braff, the episode is a homage to The Princess Bride, and features costumes and location work, including horses and a castle. According to set dresser Patrick Bolton, the village design itself (and to an extent the costume design) was a homage to Monty Python and the Holy Grail. The village features several design aspects made famous by Monty Python, such as the Dead Collector.

Series creator Bill Lawrence describes the episode as a personal effort for the cast and crew, comparable to earlier themed episodes such as "My Musical" and "My Life in Four Cameras". According to Lawrence, "Even now, after seven years, we try to do one show that we spend way too much money and time on ... We're ultimately just making ourselves happy." Braff describes the episode as both the most epic, and the most expensive episode so far, saying it includes "monsters, potions, evil wizards, giants, hunchbacks, gnomeslike World of Warcraft, but Scrubs."

A teaser for the episode posted on NBC's website featured Ted Buckland dressed as a hunchback eating a squirrel.

Early release
This episode was broadcast in Ireland on May 1, 2008, one week ahead of the scheduled premiere in the United States. The error occurred due to the Irish network broadcasting Scrubs based on the production order, under which "My Princess" was episode nine of season seven, rather than the final air order under which "My Dumb Luck" was ninth and "My Princess" was bumped to the 11th slot. This also affects the continuity of the show, because Dr. Kelso is still Chief of Medicine in this episode.

Inhabitants of Sacred Heartia
Village IdiotJ.D.
PrincessElliot
TurlaTurk and Carla
PrinceKeith
KnightDr. Cox
Irritable Townswoman of ColorNurse Shirley
GiantJanitor
HunchbackTed
Dark LordDr. Kelso
Dark Lord's prisonerDoug
Potion Shoppe ownerFranklyn
Fairy ToddsomethingThe Todd
Wood nymphsBoone and Debbie
Scary old ladyJordan

Cultural references
 Dr. Cox's comment of "My name is Percival Cox. You're killing my friend. Prepare to die", is a reference to the famous line from The Princess Bride: "Hello. My name is Inigo Montoya. You killed my father. Prepare to die!"

References

External links
 

Scrubs (season 7) episodes
2008 American television episodes